Flavio Cipolla and Konstantinos Economidis were the defending champions; however, they chose to not defend their 2008 title.
Michael Kohlmann and Philipp Marx won in the final 3–6, 6–2, 10–8, against Aisam-ul-Haq Qureshi and Lovro Zovko.

Seeds

Draw

Draw

External links
 Main Draw

GEMAX Open
GEMAX Open - Doubles